"Mele Kalikimaka" is a Hawaiian-themed Christmas song  written in 1949 by R. Alex Anderson. The song takes its title from the Hawaiian phrase , meaning "Merry Christmas".
One of the earliest recordings of this song was by Bing Crosby and the Andrews Sisters in 1950 on Decca. It has been covered by many artists and used in several films (including L.A. Confidential, Catch Me If You Can, and National Lampoon's Christmas Vacation).

History of the song 
Anderson recalled the inspiration for writing the song in 1949 while working at Vonn Hamm-Young:

Bing Crosby was a frequent visitor and golf partner of Anderson.  Anderson played the song for Crosby, who liked it so much that he surprised Anderson with the 1950 recording. In 1955, the song became part of Crosby's famous compilation album Merry Christmas. According to Anderson's daughter Pam, the family still receives revenues from all over the world every year from his songs including Mele Kalikimaka.

Origin of the phrase 
The expression  is a loan phrase from English. But since the Hawaiian language has a different phonological system from English, it is not possible to render a pronunciation that is especially close to Merry Christmas.
The earliest record of the greeting, in print is from 1904, in the Hawaiian language newspaper Ka Nupepa Kuokoa, published between 1861 and 1927.

The phrase is derived from English as follows:
 Merry Christmas
 ↓ Every consonant must be followed by a vowel in Hawaiian. The T is removed, since it is already silent in English.
 Mery Carisimasa
 ↓ C is not a letter in Hawaiian; the closest phonetic equivalent is K.
 Mery Karisimasa
 ↓ R is not a letter in Hawaiian; it is equivalent to L. Y is replaced by E, the sound it already denotes in English.
 Mele Kalisimasa
 ↓ S is not a letter in Hawaiian; the closest phonetic equivalent is K.
 Mele Kalikimaka

Charts
Bing Crosby and the Andrews Sisters version

References

External links 
 Lyrics to Mele Kalikimaka

American Christmas songs
Hawaiian music
Hawaii culture
1949 songs
Christmas in Hawaii
Bing Crosby songs
The Andrews Sisters songs
Macaronic songs
Songs about Hawaii
Christmas novelty songs